Sérgio Pessoa (born 3 September 1988, in São Paulo, Brazil) is a Brazilian-born Canadian judoka who competes in the men's 60 kg category.

Career
At the 2012 Summer Olympics, he was defeated in the second round. He finished 5th at the 2015 Pan American Games.

Since the 2012 Summer Olympics, Sergio underwent two major knee surgeries, from which many thought he would never recover. In 2014, he finally made it back to the tatami with his eye on the 2016 Summer Olympics in Rio.

In June 2016, he was named to Canada's Olympic team.

Honours
In 2012 Pessoa was awarded the Queen Elizabeth II Diamond Jubilee Medal.

Personal life
His father, also named Sergio competed at the 1988 Summer Olympics in the same weight class he competes in (60 kg) and finished in ninth. His family moved from São Paulo to Kedgwick, New Brunswick in 2005 when his dad got a job coaching judo. His father had originally worked as a stock broker but wanted his sons to have a better life and a better education in Canada.

See also 

 Judo in Quebec
 Judo in Canada
 List of Canadian judoka

References

External links
 
 

Canadian male judoka
Living people
Olympic judoka of Canada
Judoka at the 2012 Summer Olympics
Judoka at the 2016 Summer Olympics
Judoka at the 2015 Pan American Games
1988 births
Brazilian emigrants to Canada
Pan American Games medalists in judo
Pan American Games gold medalists for Brazil
Judoka at the 1987 Pan American Games
Sportspeople from São Paulo